Weissia microstoma is a species of moss belonging to the family Pottiaceae.

Synonym:
 Hymenostomum brachycarpum Nees & Hornsch.

References

Pottiaceae